Oleg Vsevolodovich Oznobikhin (born 19 February 2002) is a Russian football player. He plays for FC Krasnodar-2.

Club career
He made his debut in the Russian Football National League for FC Krasnodar-2 on 8 March 2022 in a game against FC Baltika Kaliningrad.

References

External links
 
 
 
 Profile by Russian Football National League

2002 births
Living people
Sportspeople from Vladivostok
Russian footballers
Russia youth international footballers
Association football forwards
FC Krasnodar-2 players
Russian First League players